Kibulala, Hoima, commonly referred to as "Kibulala", is a hill in Hoima District in the Western Region of Uganda. The name also refers to the human settlement that sits on that hill.

Location
The approximate coordinates of Kibulala, Hoima are 1°09'00.0"N, 31°00'00.0"E (Latitude:1.1500; Longitude:31.0000).

See also
Kaiso, Uganda
Tonya, Uganda
Bunyoro

References

Hoima District
Populated places in Western Region, Uganda